Newton Ben Katanha (born 3 February 1983) is a Zimbabwean football striker who most recently played for Phnom Penh Crown.

He was a member of the Zimbabwe national football team from 2004, and played in the 2006 African Nations Cup for the Zimbabwe national football team, which failed to qualify for the quarter-finals.

Honours
Malaysia Premier League: 1
 2004
Cambodian League: 1
 2014

References
 

1983 births
Living people
Zimbabwean footballers
Zimbabwe international footballers
Zimbabwean expatriate footballers
Zimbabwean expatriate sportspeople in Malaysia
Expatriate footballers in Malaysia
PFC Spartak Nalchik players
Russian Premier League players
Expatriate footballers in Russia
FC Schaffhausen players
Arminia Bielefeld players
FC Winterthur players
Expatriate footballers in Cambodia
Phnom Penh Crown FC players
Association football midfielders
Association football forwards